Russian Mennonite zwieback, called Tweebak in Plautdietsch, is a yeast bread roll formed from two pieces of dough that are pulled apart when eaten. Placing the two balls of dough one on top of the other so that the top one does not fall off during the baking process is part of the art and challenge that must be mastered by the baker. Traditionally, this type of zwieback is baked Saturday and eaten Sunday morning and for afternoon Faspa (Standard German: "Vesper"), a light meal.

This zwieback originated in the port cities of the Netherlands or Danzig, where toasted, dried buns were used to provision ships. Mennonite immigrants from the Netherlands, who settled in around Danzig in West Prussia continued this practice and brought it to Russia, when they migrated to new colonies in what is today Ukraine.

Recipe
Traditionally, zwieback are made using lard instead of butter or a mixture of the two. As such, zwieback is very rich and does not need butter when being eaten, although jelly or jam both go quite well. Many zwieback recipes do not use modern units of measurement, instead relying on anecdotal measurements handed down through the generations. The following recipe is a translation of a traditional recipe using modern measurements:

"Scald 2 cups of milk and 3/4 cup shortening (butter or lard, or 1/2 each) in a small saucepan. Cool to body temperature then add 2 tbsp. yeast. In separate mixing bowl, sift 3 cups of flour, then add 2 1/2 tsp. salt, 1 tsp. sugar. Add milk mixture to flour. Mix well, then add additional flour and kneed. The dough should be slightly softer than bread dough, and not sticky (approx. 5 cups of flour). Cover and let rise in a warm place until doubled in size or more, about an hour. Form dough into small balls the size of a walnut, placing one dough ball on top of another to form a snowman shape; the ball on the top should be slightly smaller than the one on the bottom. Let them rise again, around 30 min.. Bake in a hot oven at 410ºF for 20-25 min or until bottoms are golden brown. Serve warm or at room temperature."

See also
 Russian Mennonite
 Rusk
 Mennonite cuisine

References

Dutch cuisine
German cuisine
Mennonite cuisine
Plautdietsch language
Polish cuisine
Ukrainian cuisine
Russian cuisine
Yeast breads